"Sex Cymbal" is the lead single released from Sheila E.'s album of the same name. The song is a mid-tempo hip-hop/house number and features a rap verse from Sheila E. herself.

"Sex Cymbal" peaked at No. 32 on the U.S. R&B singles chart. It was the highest-charting single from the album. The B-side is the instrumental "Bass Base".

Music video
The music video showcased Sheila E. and her dancers wearing various outfits, primary color backdrops, fashion and vogue posing and dancing.

Charts

Formats and track listings
U.S. promo maxi CD single
 "Sex Cymbal" (radio remix) – 3:40
 "Sex Cymbal" (12" extended remix) – 6:35
 "Sex Cymbal" (radio edit) – 3:27
 "Sex Cymbal" (album version) – 4:28

U.S. 12", U.S. maxi CD single
 "Sex Cymbal" (12" mix) – 5:12
 "Sex Cymbal" (Jungle Groove Mix) – 2:40
 "Sex Cymbal" (4 on the Floor Mix) – 5:19
 "Bass Base" – 4:37

References

1991 singles
Sheila E. songs
Songs written by Sheila E.